Puthur (also spelt as Pootoor in early records) is a part of the city of Tiruchirappalli in Tamil Nadu, India.

The Bishop Heber College and the headquarters of the Tiruchi Co-Operative Bank are located here.  The famous goddess Kulumaye amman goat blood sacrifice festival is celebrated in this town during Maasi (a Tamil month, corresponding to March).

History of the Kulumaye amman Goat Sacrifice festival 
This Hindu festival was traditionally conducted by three Iyers and one Devendrakula Velalar (பள்ளர்) community person, in a temple that was situated on the bank of the Kulumi river. The goddess associated with that temple is called Kulumaye amman, and she was regarded as being powerful; unusually, her temple remained opened even during eclipses. Thus there was the traditional belief that this goddess was even more potent than eclipses and that she had the power to solve the astrological problems of a Hindu believer. 
 
According to the story, Kulumayae amman came from Kerala, and it is thought to have reached Puthur by river, arriving at the bank of the Kulumi river. It is said that, around this time, while the agricultural peoples of the Muthuraja community were digging a well for agricultural benefit, the blood of the goddess issued forth, and this led the people to worship her. In the story of the goddess, it is said that a sorcerer then appeared, arrested her power, and chastised her. The crying of Kulumaye amman summoned Rettamalai Ondi karuppu (a protecting god). The god Ondi karuppu requested a goat blood sacrifice to the goddess, to defeat the sorcerer. So there is a belief that, to protect the goddess, a Muthuraja community member performed a goat sacrifice using an old bronze knife. The blood of the goat was drunk by the Marulali of Vellalar community in silver bowls. Traditionally, Iyers also worshipped this goddess. 
 
In every Kulumayae thiruvila festival, a Muthuraja family has the honour of performing pooja first (locally referred to as karumbu saaru poojai), since they are traditionally held to have originated the festival. 
 
This goddess and temple was revered in common by both Puthur and Sholanganallur (a small village on the banks of Kulumi river where the festival is also celebrated).

Notes 

Neighbourhoods and suburbs of Tiruchirappalli